Midnight Sun is a graphic novel written and drawn by Ben Towle. It is a semi-fictionalized account of the rescue of the Airship Italia in 1928.

Midnight Sun was originally meant to be a six-part comic book series, but only issues 1-3 came out before SLG decided to publish the entire story in a graphic novel format.

References

American graphic novels
2007 graphic novels